Olot may refer to:
 Olot
 UE Olot
 Olot District
 Olot, Uzbekistan
 Olots
 Olot school
 Olot Palot